XHTFM-FM is a community radio station on 107.9 FM in Mazatlán Villa de Flores, Oaxaca. It is known as Radio Nahndiá.

History
On December 22, 2004, XHTFM-FM 107.9 was permitted. The station was transitioned to an indigenous concession in 2016.

References

Radio stations in Oaxaca
Community radio stations in Mexico
Indigenous radio stations in Mexico
Radio stations established in 2004